Pain Ab-e Olya (also Romanized as Pā’īn Āb-e ‘Olyā and Pa’īnāb-e ‘Olyā; also known as Pa'īnāb-e Bālā and Chal-e Zard (Persian: چال زرد), also Romanized as Chāl-e Zard) is a village in Kakavand-e Sharqi Rural District, Kakavand District, Delfan County, Lorestan Province, Iran. At the 2006 census, its population was 115, in 22 families.

References 

Towns and villages in Delfan County